The Sword of Valor is a 1924 American film starring Snowy Baker as an American sailor who falls in love with the daughter of a Spanish nobleman.

Plot
American sailor Captain Crooks (Baker) falls in love with Ynez Montego (Revier), daughter of Don Guzman de Ruis y Montejo (Lederer), who wants Ynez to marry the wealthy Eurasian, Ismid Matrouli (Cecil).

Her father takes her to the Riviera where she is kidnapped by a deranged gypsy mountaineer and Crooks sets out to rescue her. He has to fight a leading swordsman.

Cast
Snowy Baker as Captain Grant Lee Cooks
Otto Lederer as Don Guzma de Ruis y Montejo
Edwin Cecil as Ismid Matrouli
Dorothy Revier as Ynez

Preservation status
According to the Silent Era website, a print exists. The film was shown at the Pordenone Silent Film Festival in 2021.

References

External links

Sword of Valor at TCMDB
Copy of Sword of Valor at National Film and Sound Archive

1924 films
American silent feature films
American black-and-white films
Films directed by Duke Worne
1920s English-language films
Silent American drama films
1924 drama films
1920s American films
English-language drama films